Graeme Robertson may refer to:
Graeme Robertson (Australian footballer) (born 1952), Australian rules footballer
Graeme Robertson (RAF officer) (born 1945), RAF commander
Graeme Robertson (Scottish footballer) (born 1962), Scottish footballer

See also 
Graham Robertson (disambiguation)